Juan Bautista Vargas Arreola (June 24, 1890 – December 13, 1947) was a celebrated Mexican Brigadier General who fought alongside Francisco Villa in the Mexican Revolution.  He was a member of Villa's elite cavalry troops and bodyguards known as Los Dorados (The Golden Ones). At the time of his death he was Commander of the 17th Military Zone based in Querétaro, Mexico. At the request of then president Miguel Alemán Valdés, he was considering running for the Governor's seat in his home state of Durango. A street in Monterrey, Nuevo León, Mexico is named in his honor.

Birth and parentage
Juan B. Vargas was born in Ocotán, Durango on June 24, 1890. He was the son of Tomás Vargas and Manuela Arreola de Vargas. While still in his infancy, his parents moved the family to Canatlán, Durango. As a teenager he traveled to Durango's capital to continue his studies. Revolution was in the air.

The revolt against Díaz
In early 1910, Juan B. Vargas became involved with revolutionary figures Cástulo Herrera and Guillermo Baca in the state of Chihuahua. On November 20, 1910, Juan B. Vargas raised up in arms against the government of Porfirio Díaz on orders from Francisco I. Madero and Abraham González, who at time was governor of Chihuahua. He organized a guerrilla of fifty men and built-up support for the Revolution.

1890 births
1947 deaths
Military personnel from Durango
People of the Mexican Revolution
Mexican generals
Mexican rebels
Mexican people of Basque descent